Bača may refer to:

Bača (river), Slovenia
Bača pri Modreju, a village in the Municipality of Tolmin, Slovenia
Bača pri Podbrdu, a dispersed settlement in the Municipality of Tolmin, Slovenia
Bača subdialect, of Slovene
Bača (surname)

See also
Bač (name)
Baca (disambiguation)
Bacca (disambiguation)
Backa (disambiguation)